Within atmospheric science, LBLRTM - The Line-By-Line Radiative Transfer Model is an accurate, efficient and highly flexible model for calculating spectral transmittance and radiance.

See also 
List of atmospheric radiative transfer codes
Atmospheric radiative transfer codes
Absorption spectrum
HITRAN

References
Clough, S. A., M. W. Shephard, E. J. Mlawer, J. S. Delamere, M. J. Iacono, K. Cady-Pereira, S. Boukabara, and P. D. Brown, Atmospheric radiative transfer modeling: a summary of the AER codes, Short Communication, J. Quant. Spectrosc. Radiat. Transfer, 91, 233-244, 2005.
Clough, S.A. and M.J. Iacono, Line-by-line calculations of atmospheric fluxes and cooling rates II: Application to carbon dioxide, ozone, methane, nitrous oxide, and the halocarbons. J. Geophys. Res., 100, 16,519-16,535, 1995.
Clough, S.A., M.J. Iacono, and J.-L. Moncet, Line-by-line calculation of atmospheric fluxes and cooling rates:  Application to water vapor.  J. Geophys. Res., 97, 15761-15785, 1992.

External links 
AER radiative transfer model web site

Atmospheric radiative transfer codes